Global Information Assurance Certification (GIAC) is an information security certification entity that specializes in technical and practical certification as well as new research in the form of its GIAC Gold program. SANS Institute founded the certification entity in 1999 and the term GIAC is trademarked by The Escal Institute of Advanced Technologies.

GIAC provides a set of vendor-neutral computer security certifications linked to the training courses provided by the SANS. GIAC is specific to the leading edge technological advancement of IT security in order to keep ahead of "black hat" techniques.  Papers written by individuals pursuing GIAC certifications are presented at the SANS Reading Room on GIAC's website.

Initially all SANS GIAC certifications required a written paper or "practical" on a specific area of the certification in order to achieve the certification. In April 2005, the SANS organization changed the format of the certification by breaking it into two separate levels. The "silver" level certification is achieved upon completion of a multiple choice exam. The "gold" level certification can be obtained by completing a research paper and has the silver level as a prerequisite.

As of August 27, 2022, GIAC has granted 173,822 certifications worldwide.

SANS GIAC Certifications 
Certifications listed as 'unavailable' are not listed in official SANS or GIAC sources, and are found elsewhere. They are not the same as retired courses.

Cyber Defense

Penetration Testing

Management, Audit, Legal

Operations

Developer

Incident Response and Forensics

Industrial Control Systems

GSE

Unobtainable Certifications
The following certifications are no longer issued.

External links

Notes 

Computer security qualifications
Digital forensics certification